Construction Point is a point marking the west side of the entrance to Willett Cove and the south end of Seabee Hook, a low recurved spit  west-southwest of Cape Hallett, on the coast of Victoria Land. It was surveyed in January 1956 by members of U.S. Navy Operation Deepfreeze I aboard the icebreaker USS Edisto, and so named by the Advisory Committee on Antarctic Names because of its close association with Seabee Hook.

References 

Headlands of Victoria Land
Borchgrevink Coast